Virotia is a genus of six species of flowering plants in the family Proteaceae. The genus is endemic to New Caledonia with six species that were once placed in Macadamia. Its closest relatives are  the Australian Athertonia and the Asian Heliciopsis. The genus is named after Robert Virot, pioneer of ecological studies in New Caledonia and author of a monograph of New Caledonian Proteaceae.

Species
Virotia angustifolia (Virot) P.H.Weston & A.R.Mast (basionym: Macadamia angustifolia Virot)
Virotia francii (Guillaumin) P.H.Weston & A.R.Mast (basionym: Roupala francii Guillaumin) 
Virotia leptophylla (Guillaumin) L.A.S.Johnson & B.G.Briggs (basionym: Kermadecia leptophylla Guillaumin) 
Virotia neurophylla (Guillaumin) P.H.Weston & A.R.Mast (basionym: Kermadecia neurophylla Guillaumin)
Virotia rousselii (Vieill.) P.H.Weston & A.R.Mast (basionym: Roupala rousselii Vieill)
Virotia vieillardi (Brongn. & Gris) P.H.Weston & A.R.Mast (basionym: Roupala vieillardii Brongn. & Gris)

References

Proteaceae
Proteaceae genera
Endemic flora of New Caledonia
Taxa named by Barbara G. Briggs
Taxa named by Lawrence Alexander Sidney Johnson